While You Were Sleeping is a 1995 American romantic comedy film directed by Jon Turteltaub and written by Daniel G. Sullivan and Fredric Lebow. It stars Sandra Bullock as Lucy, a Chicago Transit Authority token collector, and Bill Pullman as Jack, the brother of a man whose life she saves, along with Peter Gallagher as Peter, the man who is saved, Peter Boyle and Glynis Johns as members of Peter's family, and Jack Warden as a longtime family friend and neighbor.

The film was a critical and commercial success, grossing over $182 million at the box office. Bullock and Pullman received praise for their performances. Bullock also garnered a nomination for the Golden Globe Award for Best Actress – Motion Picture Comedy or Musical.

Plot 
Lucy Eleanor Moderatz is a lonely fare token collector for the Chicago Transit Authority, stationed at the Randolph/Wabash station. She secretly loves Peter Callaghan, a handsome commuter, though they are strangers. On Christmas Day, she rescues Peter from the oncoming Chicago "L" train after muggers push him onto the tracks. She accompanies the comatose Peter to the hospital, where a nurse overhears her musing aloud, "I was going to marry him." Misinterpreting, the nurse tells his family that she is his fiancée.

Lucy becomes too caught up in the crisis to explain the truth. She remains silent for several reasons: she is embarrassed, Peter's grandmother, Elsie, has a heart condition, and Lucy falls in love with Peter's big, loving family. While visiting Peter, she confesses her predicament to him, unaware Peter's godfather Saul overhears the truth and later confronts her. He says he will keep her secret because the accident has brought the family closer.

With no family and few friends, Lucy becomes so captivated with the quirky Callaghans and their unconditional love for her that she is unable to hurt them by revealing that Peter does not know her. She spends a belated Christmas with them, then meets Peter's 
younger brother Jack, who is supposed to take over his father's furniture business, though he wants his own business. Jack is initially suspicious, but he falls in love with Lucy as they spend time together. She soon falls in love with him.

After New Year's Eve, Peter wakes up. He does not know Lucy, so it is assumed he has amnesia. She and Peter spend more time together, and Saul persuades Peter to propose to her "again"; she accepts, though she is now in love with Jack. When Jack visits her the day before the wedding, she gives him a chance to change her mind, asking if he can give her a reason not to marry Peter. He replies that he cannot, leaving her disappointed.

On the day of the wedding, just as a priest begins the ceremony, Lucy finally confesses everything and tells the family she loves Jack rather than Peter. At this point, Peter's real fiancée, Ashley Bartlett Bacon, arrives and demands the wedding be stopped. As the family argues, Lucy slips out unnoticed, unsure of her future.

Some time later, while Lucy is at work, Jack places an engagement ring in the token tray of her booth. He enters her booth and with most of the Callaghan family watching, proposes to her. Jack and Lucy are married and then leave on a CTA train for their honeymoon. Lucy narrates that he fulfilled her dream of going to Florence, Italy, and explains that, when Peter asked when she fell in love with Jack, she replied, "It was while you were sleeping."

Cast 
 Sandra Bullock as Lucy Eleanor Moderatz
 Bill Pullman as Jack Callaghan
 Peter Gallagher as Peter Callaghan
 Peter Boyle as Ox Callaghan
 Jack Warden as Saul Tuttle
 Glynis Johns as Elsie
 Micole Mercurio as Midge Callaghan
 Jason Bernard as Jerry Wallace
 Michael Rispoli as Joe Fusco, Jr.
 Ally Walker as Ashley Bartlett Bacon
 Monica Keena as Mary Callaghan

Production 
Both Demi Moore and Julia Roberts were offered the role of Lucy Moderatz but turned it down.

Though the original screenplay was entitled “Coma Guy”, the title was changed shortly after the script was acquired by Caravan Pictures. The original script was also set in New York City, but to accommodate for the film's budget, the filmmakers changed the setting to Chicago where they shot on location. Filming took place from October 8 to December 14, 1994.

Reception

Box office 
The film was a tremendous success, grossing a total of $182,057,016 worldwide against an estimated $17,000,000 budget. It made $9,288,915 on its opening weekend of April 21–23, 1995. It was the thirteenth-highest grosser of 1995 in the United States.

Critical response 
The site's critical consensus reads, "While You Were Sleeping is built wholly from familiar ingredients, but assembled with such skill – and with such a charming performance from Sandra Bullock – that it gives formula a good name." On Metacritic, the film has a weighted average score of 67 out of 100, based on reviews from 20 critics, indicating "generally favorable reviews". Audiences surveyed by CinemaScore gave the film a grade A on scale of A to F.

Roger Ebert of the Chicago Sun-Times wrote: "It's a feel-good film, warm and good-hearted, and as it was heading for its happy ending, I was still a little astonished how much I was enjoying it."

Accolades 
Bullock was nominated for the Golden Globe Award for Best Actress – Motion Picture Comedy or Musical.
The film is recognized by the American Film Institute in 2002 with a nomination for the list AFI's 100 Years...100 Passions.

References

External links

 Janet Maslin. "The Blossoming of a Wallflower". The New York Times. April 21, 1995. C16.
 
 
 Script-O-Rama: While You Were Sleeping transcript
 While You Were Sleeping at Virtual History

1995 films
1995 romantic comedy films
American Christmas comedy films
American romantic comedy films
Caravan Pictures films
Films about weddings
Films directed by Jon Turteltaub
Films set in Chicago
Films shot in Chicago
Hollywood Pictures films
Rail transport films
Films produced by Joe Roth
Films produced by Roger Birnbaum
Films scored by Randy Edelman
Love stories
1990s Christmas comedy films
Films set around New Year
1990s English-language films
1990s American films